Notton is a village and civil parish in the City of Wakefield district of West Yorkshire, England. The parish had a population of 982 at the 2011 Census. Until 1974, the parish was part of Wakefield Rural District.

In the Middle Ages the manor was held by the de Notton family, whose most notable member was William de Notton (died about  1365), Lord Chief Justice of Ireland. It later passed to the Darcy family.

Notton has a village hall on George Lane, and a post office on Applehaigh Lane.

See also
Listed buildings in Notton

References

External links

Villages in West Yorkshire
Civil parishes in West Yorkshire
Geography of the City of Wakefield